Oscar in Paris is a 1996 live album by Oscar Peterson   released in 1997.

Track listing
 "Falling in Love with Love" (Lorenz Hart, Richard Rodgers) – 9:17
 "Nighttime" – 8:39
 "Tranquille" – 9:30
 "Smudge" – 8:47
 "Love Ballade" – 10:31
 "Sushi" – 8:44
 "Kelly's Blues" – 7:08
 "She Has Gone" – 8:08
 "You Look Good to Me" (Seymour Lefco, Clement Wells) – 7:18
 "Peace" – 8:35
 "Sweet Georgia Brown" (Ben Bernie, Kenneth Casey, Maceo Pinkard) – 8:23
 "Here's That Rainy Day"/"We Will Love Again" (Johnny Burke, Jimmy Van Heusen)/(Burke, Van Heusen) – 10:56

All tracks, unless otherwise noted, composed by Oscar Peterson.

Personnel

Performance
 Oscar Peterson – piano
 Lorne Lofsky – guitar
 Niels-Henning Ørsted Pedersen – double bass
 Martin Drew – drums

Production
 Anilda Carrasquillo - art direction, design
 Mitchell Funk - photography
 Edward Gajdel
 Michael Hatch - technical assistance
 Steve Long
 Jack Renner - engineer
 Robert Woods - producer, executive producer
 Elaine Martone - producer

References

Oscar Peterson live albums
1997 live albums
Telarc Records live albums